Tribulocarpus is a genus of flowering plants belonging to the family Aizoaceae.

Its native range is Ethiopia to Southern Africa.

Species:
 Tribulocarpus dimorphanthus (Pax) S.Moore 
 Tribulocarpus retusus (Thulin) Thulin & Liede 
 Tribulocarpus somalensis (Engl.) Sukhor.

References

Aizoaceae
Aizoaceae genera